John-Ford David Griffin (born November 19, 1979) is an American former professional baseball outfielder. He played in Major League Baseball (MLB) for the Toronto Blue Jays.

Early life
An All-State athlete at Sarasota High School, was part of a state championship team in 1996 for the Sailors. Griffin played college baseball under head coach Mike Martin for the Florida State University Seminoles from 1999 to 2001. Griffin's career batting average was .427, a Florida State record at the time.

Professional career
Griffin was drafted out of Florida State by the New York Yankees with the 23rd overall pick in the 2001 First-Year Player Draft. On July 5, 2002, Griffin and future Blue Jay teammates Ted Lilly and Jason Arnold were traded to the Oakland Athletics as part of a three-team deal also involving the Detroit Tigers. On January 7, 2003, Griffin was traded to the Blue Jays in exchange for minor leaguer Jason Perry.

Griffin posted decent numbers in his 2004 campaign with the Double-A New Hampshire Fisher Cats, hitting .248 with 22 home runs and 81 runs batted in. His 2005 season with the Syracuse Chiefs was even better, as he led the International League with 30 home runs and 103 RBIs on the way to earning both an International League All-Star selection and the Team MVP award from Syracuse.

Griffin made his major league debut and collected his first major-league hit, a double, on September 6, 2005, in a game against the Baltimore Orioles. On the final day of the regular season, he hit his first Major League home run against Kansas City Royals pitcher Jimmy Gobble. During his major league stint in 2005, Griffin hit .308 with one home run and six RBIs.

In 2006, Griffin's numbers declined due to injuries, as he hit .225 with six home runs in 60 games for Syracuse.

In 2007, Griffin rebounded in Syracuse, hitting .252/.330/.488 with 26 home runs and struck out 144 times. He hit well on a September callup to Toronto and is now a career .304/.370/.696 hitter in 27 major league plate appearances. He has hit two major league home runs.

In 2008, Griffin played for the Las Vegas 51s in the Dodgers farm system. He re-signed with the Dodgers in February 2009 and played briefly for the AAA Albuquerque Isotopes before he was released by the Dodgers on May 25 and signed a new minor league contract with the Chicago Cubs.

In 2010, Griffin played for the Newark Bears of the Atlantic League of Professional Baseball, but announced his retirement on June 18, 2010.

In 2012, Griffin was inducted into the FSU Hall of Fame.

References

External links

1979 births
Living people
Albuquerque Isotopes players
All-American college baseball players
American expatriate baseball players in Canada
Baseball players from Florida
Florida State Seminoles baseball players
Iowa Cubs players
Las Vegas 51s players
Major League Baseball outfielders
New Haven Ravens players
Newark Bears players
Norwich Navigators players
Phoenix Desert Dogs players
Sarasota High School alumni
Sportspeople from Sarasota, Florida
Staten Island Yankees players
Syracuse SkyChiefs players
Syracuse Chiefs players
Tampa Yankees players
Toronto Blue Jays players